Serena Guen is a publisher, businesswoman and philanthropist based in London.

Biography
In 2012, Guen founded Suitcase Magazine, a multimedia travel magazine from her dorm room at New York University.  Guen ran it remotely during her senior year in New York City before eventually settling back in London. Suitcase prints four editions a year, in addition to its website which is updated daily, and is circulated globally across all seven continents.

Since 2014, Guen was part of the steering committee for UNICEF Next Generation London Team. In 2016, she founded the #CookForSyria movement with Clerkenwellboy. The movement raised money for UNICEF's Syria appeal in London, Sydney and Melbourne to date. It also produced two cookbook, Cook For Syria the Recipe Book (2016). and Bake For Syria (2018).

Guen has fronted campaigns for Jack Wills Young Briton's, Urban Outfitters and Clinique's Face Forward.

Awards
2014: Winner, Media category, Women of the Future Awards
2016: Shortlisted, Young Travel Entrepreneur of the Year Award, Travel and Hospitality Hall of Fame, UK 
2017: One of Forbes 30 under 30 for media

See also
Natalie Massenet
Sheryl Sandberg
Tavi Gevinson

References

External links
Suitcase Magazine

Living people
English businesspeople in fashion
British women company founders
Officers of the Order of the British Empire
British fashion journalists
Year of birth missing (living people)